The Ralt RT4 is an open-wheel formula racing car, designed, developed and built by Ralt, for Formula Atlantic (and was also occasionally raced in Formula Two categories), in 1980. It was later converted into a closed-wheel prototype, and used in the revived Can-Am series, between 1982 and 1985, where it achieved only modest success. In Can-Am copetition the car achieved 1 podium finish, 1 class victory and a best result of a 2nd-place finish.

Background
The RT4 was the car of choice in Australian Formula 1 and Formula Mondial during the early to mid-1980s. Roberto Moreno drove an RT4 to win the Australian Grand Prix in 1981, 1983, and the final AGP in 1984 before it became a round of the Formula One World Championship in 1985, while Alain Prost also drove one to victory in the 1982 Australian Grand Prix. Other F1 drivers to drive a Ralt RT4 in Australia during this period included Jacques Laffite and Andrea de Cesaris, as well as World Champions Alan Jones, Nelson Piquet, Keke Rosberg and Niki Lauda. The chassis was constructed out of an aluminum monocoque, covered in a fiberglass body. It was also very light, weighing only .

References

Open wheel racing cars
Formula Atlantic
Formula Two cars